The Stormy Sea in Étretat is an 1883 painting by one of the founders of French Impressionism, Claude Monet. The painting is now preserved at the Musée des Beaux-Arts de Lyon.

The painting depicts a stormy sea on a winter day. The cliff in the background is at Étretat, (Seine Maritime); Monet frequently stayed in the area during the winter of 1864–65, and wrote: "I spend my time outdoors on the rocks when the weather's rough [...] and of course I work all the time." Monet composed the painting in February 1883 from his hotel window. Subsequently, the painting was bought by the Parisian dealer Paul Durand-Ruel, and then became the property of the Musée des Beaux-Arts de Lyon in 1902. The museum was a forerunner in the collecting of early 20th century Impressionist paintings.

The painting is composed of four major elements, each painted in a different way. The central part is invaded by the pearlized surfs painted in forms of commas. In the foreground, a small beach on which there are old boats filled with thatch on the left, and two fishermen with their boats in poor condition that ran aground on the shore. On the left, in the background, the cliff of Étretat can be seen and the rock strata are evoked by horizontal lines of brush. Finally, the upper part of the painting shows the sky, painted in a way that expresses a curtain of rain.

References

Maritime paintings
1883 paintings
Paintings by Claude Monet
Paintings in the collection of the Museum of Fine Arts of Lyon